Forces and Fields :The concept of Action at a Distance in the history of physics (1961) is a book by Mary B. Hesse, published by Philosophical library.

Summary

Forces and Fields has eleven chapters.  The first ten chapters consist of 5 or more sections.  The eleventh, 2 sections.  These chapters are titled The Logical Status of Theories, The Primitive Analogies, Mechanism in Greek Science, The Greek Inheritance, The Corpuscular Philosophy, The Theory of Gravitation, Action at a Distance, The Field Theories, The theory of Relativity, Modern Physics, and The Metaphysical Framework of Physics.

See also
 Action at a distance

References

1961 non-fiction books
Books about the history of science
Philosophy of science books